He Yafei (born 1955) is a Chinese diplomat and currently Vice-Minister of the Ministry of Foreign Affairs.  He is reported by The Guardian newspaper to have moved post in early 2010.

Biography
He Yafei was born in 1955 and is a native of Ningbo, Zhejiang province. He completed studies at the Graduate Institute of International Studies in Geneva, Switzerland and holds a master's degree. He is a lifelong diplomat. He is now vice-minister of the Ministry of Foreign Affairs. His responsibilities include: North America and Oceania, international organizations and conferences, arms control, protocol, Hong Kong, Macao and Taiwan-related foreign affairs. He is married and has one daughter. He represented China during the negotiations of the Copenhagen Accord in December 2009. Between 2010 and 2012, he served as the ambassador of China in United Nations Office at Geneva and representative of other international organizations in Switzerland.

References

1955 births
Living people
Diplomats of the People's Republic of China
Graduate Institute of International and Development Studies alumni
Beijing Foreign Studies University alumni
Zhejiang University alumni
Chinese diplomats
Educators from Ningbo
Academic staff of Jinan University